Project Cassandra was an effort led by the United States Drug Enforcement Administration (DEA) to undercut Hezbollah funding from illicit drug sources in South America.  Launched in 2008, the project was investigating the terrorist organization's funding. The DEA, Eurojust, and Europol found that Hezbollah was increasingly involved with drug trafficking and organized crime as a method of funding its activities. The investigation was tracking how hundreds of millions of dollars were being laundered from North America through Europe and West Africa to Lebanon and into Hezbollah's coffers. 

"Members of Hezbollah established business relationships with South American drug cartels responsible for supplying large quantities of cocaine to the European and United States drug markets. An intricate network of money couriers collect and transport millions of euros in drug proceeds from Europe to the Middle East. The currency is then paid in Colombia to drug traffickers using the Hawala disbursement system. A large portion of the drug proceeds is laundered through Lebanon [facilitated by the now-defunct Lebanese Canadian Bank and other Lebanese nationals], where it is then used for the benefit of Hezbollah to purchase weapons."

Josh Meyer's investigative report, published by Politico in December 2017, described how, during the Obama administration, concerns regarding the Iran nuclear deal took precedence over the DEA project. This caused Project Cassandra to be halted, as it was approaching the upper echelons of Hezbollah's conspiracy, in order to seal a nuclear deal with Iran, even though Hezbollah was still funneling cocaine into the United States. A former Obama administration Treasury official, Katherine Bauer, confirmed this during her testimony to the House Committee on Foreign Affairs in February 2017.

See also
 Iran nuclear deal framework

References

Iran–United States relations
Obama administration controversies
Hezbollah
Money laundering